The 2022 Finalissima was the third edition of the CONMEBOL–UEFA Cup of Champions, an intercontinental football match between the winners of the previous South American and European championships. The match featured Italy, winners of UEFA Euro 2020 (held in 2021), and Argentina, winners of the 2021 Copa América. It was played at Wembley Stadium in London, England, on 1 June 2022. The match, a revival of the Artemio Franchi Cup last played 29 years prior, was organised by UEFA and CONMEBOL as part of a renewed partnership between the two confederations.

Argentina won the match 3–0 for their second CONMEBOL–UEFA Cup of Champions title.

Background
In 1985 and 1993, the winners of the prior UEFA European Championship and Copa América tournaments played in the Artemio Franchi Cup (also known as the European/South American Nations Cup), a one-off match organised by UEFA and CONMEBOL. It was the national team equivalent to the former Intercontinental Cup on the club level, which was played between the winners of the European Cup/UEFA Champions League and Copa Libertadores. France won the 1985 Artemio Franchi Cup in Paris, while Argentina won the 1993 match in Mar del Plata. However, the competition was discontinued thereafter. The Artemio Franchi Cup can be considered a precursor of the King Fahd Cup/FIFA Confederations Cup, played in 1992 for the first time and organised by FIFA from 1997, which featured the title holders of all the continental championships and FIFA World Cup. After the 2017 edition, FIFA announced on 15 March 2019 that the tournament would be abolished.

On 12 February 2020, UEFA and CONMEBOL signed a renewed memorandum of understanding meant to enhance cooperation between the two organisations. As part of the agreement, a joint UEFA–CONMEBOL committee examined the possibility of staging European–South American intercontinental matches, for both men's and women's football and across various age groups. On 28 September 2021, UEFA and CONMEBOL confirmed that the UEFA European Championship and Copa América winners would face each other in an intercontinental match, with the agreement initially covering three editions starting in 2022. The first edition was confirmed to take place during the June 2022 international window at a venue to be confirmed. On 15 December 2021, UEFA and CONMEBOL again signed a renewed memorandum of understanding lasting until 2028, which included specific provisions on opening a joint office in London and the potential organisation of various football events. The match was confirmed to take place in London on 1 June 2022, with the venue yet to be decided. On 22 March 2022, UEFA announced the match would take place at Wembley Stadium. At the same time, the brand identity was revealed, and UEFA announced that the "CONMEBOL–UEFA Cup of Champions" was the new name for the Artemio Franchi Cup.

Teams

Italy qualified for the match by virtue of winning UEFA Euro 2020 (held in 2021), having defeated England on penalties in the final, also held at Wembley, for their second UEFA European Championship title. Argentina qualified by winning the 2021 Copa América, defeating Brazil 1–0 in the final for a record-equalling 15th Copa América title, their first trophy in 28 years.

Venue

The match was held at Wembley Stadium in London, England. Wembley Stadium opened in 2007 on the site of the original stadium, the demolition of which took place between 2002 and 2003. Owned by the Football Association (FA), it serves as England's national football stadium. The stadium was a host venue of UEFA Euro 2020, including the final, won by Italy on penalties over England. The original stadium, formerly known as the Empire Stadium, opened in 1923 and hosted matches at the 1966 FIFA World Cup, including the final, which saw hosts England beat West Germany 4–2 after extra time, and at UEFA Euro 1996, including the final, in which Germany defeated the Czech Republic. Wembley also hosts the annual FA Cup Final, doing so since the White Horse Final of 1923 (excluding 2001 to 2006, when the stadium was being rebuilt).

Squads
Both national teams had to submit a squad of 23 players – of which three had to be goalkeepers – by 29 May 2022, three days prior to the match.

Italy
Italy announced a 39-man preliminary squad on 23 May 2022. The squad was extended to 45 players on 27 May, with eight players added while Domenico Berardi and Andrea Pinamonti withdrew injured. The final squad was announced on 30 May.

Manager: Roberto Mancini

Argentina
Argentina announced a 35-man preliminary squad on 13 May 2022. The squad was reduced to 29 players on 20 May. The final squad was announced on 1 June.

Manager: Lionel Scaloni

Pre-match

Identity

UEFA revealed the brand identity for the match on 22 March 2022. The match was known as the Finalissima, Italian for "grand final". The logo was based on the laurel wreath, a symbol of victory. It features ribbons in the colours of the competing nations, the green, white and red of Italy on the left, and the white and light blue of Argentina. In addition, several ribbons are in platinum and gold, intended to highlight the significance of the match. According to UEFA, the ribbons are "symbolic of the strong bonds between CONMEBOL and UEFA, and of their commitment to the development of football beyond their geographical zones".

Ticketing
The stadium capacity was 86,000 for the match, with tickets sold to fans and the general public on a first-come, first-served basis via UEFA.com. Available from 24 March 2022, the tickets were available in four price categories: £25, £40, £55 and £99.

Officials
On 30 May 2022, 37-year-old Chilean referee Piero Maza was announced as the referee for the match, made as a joint appointment by CONMEBOL and UEFA. Maza had been a FIFA referee since 2018, though the match was his first senior international fixture as a referee. However, Maza did previously serve as a fourth official and VAR assistant at the 2019 Copa América, as well as a VAR at the 2019 FIFA U-17 World Cup. He was joined by his fellow countrymen Christian Schiemann and Claudio Ríos as assistant referees. Spanish referee Jesús Gil Manzano served as the fourth official, with his compatriots Alejandro Hernández Hernández and Juan Martínez Munuera serving as the VAR and one of the VAR assistants, respectively. Tiago Martins of Portugal was the other VAR assistant.

Match

Details

Statistics

Notes

References

External links

2022
2021–22 in UEFA football
2022 in South American football
Italy national football team matches
2021–22 in Italian football
Argentina national football team matches
2022 in Argentine football
International association football competitions hosted by London
2022 sports events in London
June 2022 sports events in the United Kingdom
Events at Wembley Stadium
Association football matches in England